Andrew Eppley Shue (born February 20, 1967) is an American actor, known for his role as Billy Campbell on the television series Melrose Place (1992–1999). Shue played soccer professionally for several years. He co-founded and served on the board of directors of the global non-profit organization Do Something, and co-founded the social networking website CafeMom.

Early life
Shue was born in Wilmington, Delaware. His mother, Anne Brewster (née Wells; born 1938), is a bank executive who was the vice president of the private division of the Chemical Bank Corporation. His father, James William Shue (born 1936 – died May 24, 2013), was a lawyer and real estate developer who was the president of the International Food and Beverage Corporation and was active in Republican politics, having once unsuccessfully run for the U.S. Congress in New Jersey. His mother was a descendant of Pilgrim leader William Brewster and his father was of German ancestry, from Pennsylvania. 

Shue's sister Elisabeth is an actress; in three of his early uncredited film appearances, he appeared with her in The Karate Kid, Cocktail and Adventures in Babysitting.

Shue attended Columbia High School in Maplewood, New Jersey. Along with his sister, he was inducted into the CHS Hall of fame in 1994. At Dartmouth College, as he was in high school, Shue was a Regional All America soccer player and spent a winter studying and playing soccer in Glasgow, Scotland for Queen's Park FC. Shue received his B.A. in history from Dartmouth in 1989. After graduating, he visited Zimbabwe, where he simultaneously played soccer and taught high school math at Founders High School.

Career

Acting
In May 1992, Shue was cast to play the role of Billy Campbell on the Aaron Spelling soap opera Melrose Place. He starred opposite Courtney Thorne-Smith, whom he later dated. Shue stayed on the show for six years. During this time, he appeared as an abusive husband in the Francis Ford Coppola film The Rainmaker, starring Matt Damon and Claire Danes.

A 1996 commercial for SportsCenter on ESPN has Shue being traded for former SportsCenter anchor Charley Steiner, where Steiner takes his position on Melrose Place and Shue takes his on SportsCenter.

He worked on the 2007 feature film, Gracie, with his sister Elisabeth, his brother John, and his brother-in-law, Davis Guggenheim, the Oscar-winning director of An Inconvenient Truth. Shue co-produced the film and also appeared in a minor role. It pays tribute to the Shue siblings' elder brother Will, who died in an accident in 1988. The story is loosely based on Elisabeth's childhood, when she was the only girl playing on an all-boys soccer team.

Soccer
During his time in Zimbabwe, Shue played for Bulawayo Highlanders. That season, the Highlanders won both Zimbabwe Premier Soccer League and CBZ Cup titles. At the time, Shue was the only white player in the Zimbabwe Premier Soccer League. In September 1993, he played one game with Los Angeles United of the Continental Indoor Soccer League. In July 1994, he played two games for Anaheim Splash. In 1996, while still on Melrose Place, Shue played for the Los Angeles Galaxy of Major League Soccer, recording one assist in five games. He spent the entire 1997 season on injured reserve.

Entrepreneur
Along with his childhood best friend Michael Sanchez, Shue co-founded DoSomething. He now sits on the board of directors.

In 2006 Shue and Sanchez co-founded the social networking website CafeMom. Lead investors are Highland Capital Partners and Draper Fisher Jurvetson. The site used to provide an online community for moms to connect and share advice and ideas. CafeMom's community forums were shut down at 5:00 pm EST on May 24, 2018. The company cited high advertising costs as the reason for the shutdown. The CafeMom is now a family of companies, including blog The Stir, Baby Name Wizard and popular Latina site MamasLatinas.

Shue co-hosted the podcast "Mad Life" with his mother-in-law, Joan Robach, and comedian Chuck Nice.

Personal life
Shue married floral designer Jennifer Hageney in 1994. They have three sons. They divorced in 2008.

In 2010, Shue married Good Morning America co-anchor and ABC News correspondent Amy Robach. She has two daughters from a previous marriage. It was reported he and Robach separated in August 2022 due to Robach’s affair with T. J. Holmes.

Filmography

References

External links

 
 Andrew Shue at "How Stuff Works"
 

1967 births
Living people
American people of English descent
American people of German descent
American male film actors
American soccer players
Soccer players from Delaware
Male actors from Wilmington, Delaware
Sportspeople from Wilmington, Delaware
20th-century American male actors
21st-century American male actors
Columbia High School (New Jersey) alumni
Dartmouth College alumni
Association football midfielders
Dartmouth Big Green men's soccer players
Highlanders F.C. players
Los Angeles United players
Anaheim Splash players
LA Galaxy players
Zimbabwe Premier Soccer League players
Major League Soccer players
Continental Indoor Soccer League players
American expatriate soccer players
Expatriate footballers in Zimbabwe
American expatriates in Zimbabwe